Issam Abuanza is the former Islamic State health minister of the Islamic State Health Service.  A Palestinian with British citizenship, he is the first practicing National Health Service doctor known to have joined the Islamic State group.  Concerning the death of Jordanian pilot Muath Al-Kasasbeh, he stated:

Abuanza, then living in Sheffield with a wife and two children, travelled to Syria alone in July 2014.

References

Living people
Year of birth unknown
British Islamists
Palestinian Islamists
British Sunni Muslims
Palestinian Sunni Muslims
Palestinian emigrants to the United Kingdom
Islamic State of Iraq and the Levant members
Naturalised citizens of the United Kingdom
Islamic State of Iraq and the Levant and the United Kingdom
Year of birth missing (living people)